Claudine Gay is a political scientist and university administrator. On July 1, 2023, Harvard University has announced, she will become President of Harvard University. She serves currently as Harvard University's Wilbur A. Cowett Professor of Government and of African and African-American Studies and the Edgerley Family Dean of Harvard Faculty of Arts and Sciences.

Gay's research addresses American political behavior, including voter turnout and politics of race and identity.

Early life and education 
Gay grew up the child of Haitian immigrants, who came to the United States over fifty years ago. Her parents met in New York City as students. Her mother studied nursing and her father studied  engineering. Gay is a cousin of writer Roxane Gay.

Gay spent much of her childhood first in New York City, and then in Saudi Arabia, where her father worked for the U.S. Army Corps of Engineers. Her mother was a registered nurse. Gay attended Phillips Exeter Academy, a selective private boarding school in Exeter, New Hampshire, and then attended Stanford University, where she studied economics. She received the Anna Laura Myers Prize for best undergraduate thesis in economics and graduated in 1992. Gay then earned her Ph.D. in 1998 from Harvard University, where she won the university's Toppan Prize for best dissertation in political science.

Career 
Gay served as assistant professor, then associate professor in Stanford University's Department of Political Science from 2000 to 2006. In the 2003-2004 academic year, Gay was a fellow at the Center for Advanced Study in the Behavioral Sciences. She subsequently moved to Harvard University. In July 2015, she was named Dean of Social Science at Harvard University. In July 2018, she was named the Edgerley Family Dean of the Harvard Faculty of Arts and Sciences.

Gay's academic research addresses American political behavior, politics of race and identity, and voter turnout, and other topics.

She was a vice president of the Midwest Political Science Association from 2014 to 2017.

Since 2017, Gay has also served as a trustee of Phillips Exeter Academy.

On December 15, 2022, Harvard University announced that Gay had been selected as the 30th president of Harvard University, with her term beginning on July 1, 2023. She will be Harvard’s first black president.

Publications
 1998: "Doubly Bound: The Impact of Gender and Race on the Politics of Black Women", Political Psychology, co-authored with Katherine Tate  
 2001: "The Effect of Black Congressional Representation on Political Participation", American Political Science Review 
 2001: The Effect of Minority Districts and Minority Representation on Political Participation in California, Public Policy Institute of California 
 2002: "Spirals of Trust? The Effect of Descriptive Representation on the Relationship Between Citizens and Their Government", American Journal of Political Science 
 2004: "Putting Race in Context: Identifying the Environmental Determinants of Black Racial Attitudes", American Political Science Review  
 2006: "Seeing Difference: The Effect of Economic Disparity on Black Attitudes Toward Latinos", American Journal of Political Science 
 2007: "Legislating Without Constraints: The Effect of Minority Districting on Legislators' Responsiveness to Constituency Preferences", The Journal of Politics 
 2012: "Moving to Opportunity: The Political Effects of a Housing Mobility Experiment", Urban Affairs Review 
 2013: Outsiders No More? Models of Immigrant Political Incorporation, Oxford University Press, co-editor with Jacqueline Chattopadhyay, Jennifer Hochschild, and Michael Jones-Correa 
 2014: "Knowledge Matters: Policy Cross-pressures and Black Partisanship", Political Behavior

References

External links
Biography at Harvard University website

Living people
Year of birth missing (living people)
21st-century African-American women
African-American women academic administrators
American academic administrators
American people of Haitian descent
American political scientists
American women academics
American women political scientists
Black studies scholars
Harvard Graduate School of Arts and Sciences alumni
Harvard University administrators
Harvard University faculty
Phillips Exeter Academy alumni
Stanford University alumni